Allan Henning (born 1 June 1944) is a former professional golfer from South Africa.

Henning was born into a golfing family. His brothers Harold, Brian, and Graham all became professional golfers.

Henning turned professional in 1962 and won 18 tournaments on the South African Sunshine Tour between 1963 and 1980. His biggest win was the South African Open when it was played twice in 1963. Henning also had 4 playoff losses and 3 runner up positions in the South African Open. He also secured a big win at the South African Masters in 1968.

Henning won the Sunshine Tour Order of Merit in two consecutive seasons, in 1974/75 and 1975/76. He represented SA in World Cup and World Series of Golf. Henning was also the first to score a record 61 at the Toro Classic played at Glendower GC in 1976. 

As a senior, Henning won the South African Senior Championships three times and the Senior Order of Merit three times. He recorded a further nine victories on the now defunct Paradym Tour.

Professional wins (20)

Southern Africa circuit wins (9)
1963 South African Open
1965 Western Province Open
1966 Rhodesian Dunlop Masters
1967 Transvaal Open, Kalahari Classic
1968 Dunlop South African Masters 
1970 Schoeman Park Open, Bata Bush Babes Tournament, Flame Lily Tournament

Sunshine Tour wins (7) 
1974 Rhodesian Dunlop Masters
1975 Rolux Toro Classic
1976 Datsun International, NCR Western Province Open, Rhodesian Dunlop Masters
1977 Rhodesian Dunlop Masters
1980 Kronenbrau Orkney Open
1980 Vaal Reefs Open

Other wins (4)
1994 South African Seniors
1998 John Bland Invitational, Vodacom Senior Series: Welkom
2000 Nelson Mandela Invitational (with Retief Goosen)

Team appearances
World Cup (representing South Africa): 1970

See also
1966 PGA Tour Qualifying School graduates

References

External links

South African male golfers
Sunshine Tour golfers
Golfers from Johannesburg
1944 births
Living people
20th-century South African people